O'Donnell is a station on Line 6 of the Madrid Metro, located near the Royal Mint of Spain and the intersection of O'Donnell and Doctor Esquerdo streets in fare Zone A. It serves the neighborhoods of Goya and Fuente del Berro in the Salamanca district and the neighborhood of Ibiza in the Retiro district of Madrid. The station was inaugurated on 10 October 1979 along with all of the other stations between Pacífico and Cuatro Caminos. The station is named after , which in turn is named after the 19th-century Spanish politician Leopoldo O'Donnell.

References 

Line 6 (Madrid Metro) stations

Railway stations in Spain opened in 1979